Esther McCoy (November 18, 1904 in Horatio, Arkansas – December 30, 1989) was an American author and architectural historian who was instrumental in bringing the modern architecture of California to the attention of the world.

Early life and education
Born in Horatio, Arkansas, Esther McCoy was raised in Kansas. She attended the Central College for Women, a preparatory school in Lexington, Missouri, prior to a college career which took her from Baker University, to the University of Arkansas, then to Washington University in St. Louis, and finally the University of Michigan. She left the University of Michigan in 1925, and by 1926 was living in New York City and embarking on a writing career.

California and later life
In 1932 McCoy was diagnosed with pneumonia and headed West for Los Angeles to recover.  She purchased in a bungalow in the Ocean Park section of Santa Monica in the late 1930s, where she lived for the remainder of her life, although she traveled widely.  During World War II, McCoy worked as a draftsman for R.M. Schindler after being discouraged from applying to USC's architecture school due to her age and sex.  After a long and varied writing and teaching career, she died in December 1989.

Fiction and journalism
In 1929, McCoy began to publish fiction in magazines such as The New Yorker and Harper's Bazaar, as well as in university quarterlies. Her short story "The Cape" was featured in The Best American Short Stories of 1950. In 1924, McCoy met author Theodore Dreiser, and for more than a decade she conducted research for him. She wrote novels, short stories and screenplays during her years in New York and after moving to Los Angeles. She continued to write fiction into the 1960s, though her first significant article on architecture had been published in 1945. McCoy and a friend, Allen Read, co-authored a series of detective novels under the pseudonym "Allan McRoyd."

McCoy was also a journalist and active member of the Left who wrote for Direction,  Upton Sinclair's EPIC [End Poverty in California] News, and the United Progressive News.

Architectural writing
From 1950 until her death in 1989, McCoy was a frequent contributor to John Entenza's Los Angeles-based magazine Arts & Architecture, to Architectural Forum, Architectural Record, and Progressive Architecture, as well as to European magazines such as L'Architectura and Lotus. She also wrote pieces on architecture for the Los Angeles Times and the Los Angeles Herald-Examiner.

Her first major book, published in 1960, was Five California Architects, the first work to bring to the attention of a wide audience the works of pioneer California modernists Charles and Henry Greene, Irving Gill, Bernard Maybeck, and the Los Angeles-based Austrian emigre Rudolf Schindler. This book was followed by others devoted to the Case Study Houses sponsored by Arts & Architecture, Schindler's fellow emigre Richard Neutra, and architects Craig Ellwood, Calvin C. Straub, among others.

During this era she also wrote catalogues for gallery and museum exhibitions devoted to modern California architecture, and contributed essays to numerous other exhibition catalogues. She lectured at the University of Southern California and at UCLA, and transcribed and catalogued Richard Neutra's papers in the UCLA archives.

In addition to her work in California, McCoy wrote extensively on Italian architecture, making several extended trips there during the 1950s and 1960s, and she was curator of  an exhibition entitled Ten Italian Architects which was mounted by the Los Angeles County Museum of Art. In recognition of her research and writing on Italian architecture, the Italian government in 1960 awarded her the Star of the Order of Solidarity.

McCoy's last work was an essay for the catalog of an exhibition on the Case Study Houses which was mounted by the Los Angeles Museum of Contemporary Art. She died in Santa Monica in December, 1989, one month before the exhibition opened.

Her extensive collection of papers, slides and photographs, are held by the Archives of American Art of the Smithsonian Institution.

In March 2012, East of Borneo Books published Piecing Together Los Angeles: An Esther McCoy Reader, the first collection of McCoy's writings, edited and with an essay by writer Susan Morgan.

Books
 1960: Five California Architects, (New York: Reinhold).
 1960: Richard Neutra, (New York: G. Braziller).
 1962: Modern California Houses: Case Study Houses (New York: Reinhold)
 reprinted as Case Study Houses, (Los Angeles: Hennessey and Ingalls), 1978.
 1968: Craig Ellwood (New York: Walker & Company).
 reprinted (Los Angeles: Hennessey and Ingalls), 1998.
 1979: Vienna to Los Angeles: Two Journeys (Santa Monica, Calif.: Arts & Architecture Press).
 1984: The Second Generation (Salt Lake City: Peregrine Smith Books).
 2012: Piecing Together Los Angeles: An Esther McCoy Reader (Ed. Susan Morgan. Los Angeles: East of Borneo Books).

References

Sources
 
 
 Esther McCoy Collection at the Archives of American Art
 Piecing Together Los Angeles: An Esther McCoy Reader
 "Esther McCoy, Mother Modern"
One Woman Crusade
"Reading L.A.: Esther McCoy"

External links 
 Esther McCoy papers, 1876-1990, bulk, 1938-1989. Archives of American Art, Smithsonian Institution.A finding aid to the fully digitized papers of Esther McCoy.

American non-fiction writers
20th-century American novelists
American women novelists
American architecture writers
Architecture critics
American architectural historians
Modernist architecture in California
1904 births
1989 deaths
Writers from Los Angeles
University of Michigan alumni
American women historians
20th-century American women writers
20th-century American historians
Historians from California
Baker University alumni
University of Arkansas alumni
Washington University in St. Louis alumni